Ismet Lushaku (born 22 September 2000) is a professional footballer who plays as a midfielder for Swedish club Varbergs BoIS. Born in Sweden, he plays for the Kosovo national team.

Club career

AFC Eskilstuna
On 2 May 2019, Lushaku signed his first professional contract with Allsvenskan side AFC Eskilstuna after agreeing to a three-year deal. Sixteen days later, he made his debut in a 1–1 home draw against Helsingborgs IF after coming on as a substitute at 60th minute in place of Wilhelm Loeper.

Varbergs BoIS
On 17 January 2022, Lushaku signed a four-year contract with Allsvenskan club Varbergs BoIS. His debut with Varbergs BoIS came on 19 February in the 2021–22 Svenska Cupen group stage against Sollentuna after being named in the starting line-up.

International career

Under-21
On 27 May 2019, Lushaku received a call-up from Kosovo U21 for 2021 UEFA European Under-21 Championship qualification matches against Andorra U21 and Turkey U21. Ten days later, he made his debut with Kosovo U21 in a match against Andorra U21 after coming on as a substitute at 66th minute in place of Mirlind Daku.

Senior
On 24 December 2019, Lushaku received a call-up from Kosovo for the friendly match against Sweden, and made his debut after coming on as a substitute at 32nd minute in place of injured Florian Loshaj.

References

External links

2000 births
Living people
People from Eskilstuna
Kosovan men's footballers
Kosovo under-21 international footballers
Kosovo international footballers
Swedish men's footballers
Swedish people of Kosovan descent
Swedish people of Albanian descent
Association football midfielders
Allsvenskan players
AFC Eskilstuna players
Varbergs BoIS players
Sportspeople from Södermanland County